The Orlando Film Festival is an annual film festival held in Orlando, Florida, for independent filmmakers to showcase their work. The festival attracts upwards of 1,000 entries from filmmakers in more than 30 countries every year.

History
The festival is open to film of all lengths and genres, including experimental, narrative, animation, documentary and genre hybrids. Past celebrity attendees are Marcia Gay Harden (2006), Joe Pantoliano (2007), Olympia Dukakis, Haley Joel Osment and Alison Brie (2010).

The 2015 festival ran from 21 to 25 October and began with the 45-minute documentary about the rise to prominence of the Orlando City Soccer Club.

References

Experimental film festivals
Film festivals in Florida
Festivals in Orlando, Florida